The 1895–96 Football Tournament was the 7th staging of The Football Tournament.

Overview
It was contested by 3 teams, and Akademisk Boldklub won the championship.

League standings

References

External links
RSSSF

1895–96 in Danish football
Top level Danish football league seasons
The Football Tournament seasons
Denmark